The following is a list of personal information managers (PIMs) and online organizers.

Applications

Discontinued applications

See also

Comparisons
 Comparison of email clients
 Comparison of file managers
 Comparison of note-taking software
 Comparison of reference management software
 Comparison of text editors
 Comparison of wiki software
 Comparison of word processors

Lists
 List of outliners
 Comparison of project management software
 List of text editors
 List of wiki software

External links
 
 
 

 
Lists of software